Bouygues Telecom is a French mobile phone, Internet service provider and IPTV company, part of the Bouygues group. It is the third oldest mobile network operator in France, after Orange and SFR, and before Free Mobile. Its headquarters, designed by Arquitectonica, is located at the border of Paris and Issy-les-Moulineaux near the River Seine.

History
Bouygues Telecom was authorised by the French government to build and operate France's third GSM mobile phone network on 4 December 1994, and commercially launched its network on 30 May 1996. To compensate for its initial weaker coverage in comparison to Orange and SFR, Bouygues Telecom developed several innovations:

 heavy use of the 1800 MHz frequency band, which is more efficient in urban areas;
 the marketing of the first combo packages in May 1996;
 the launch of France's first SMS service in 1996, initially only between its subscribers, not billed until 1997;
 a free call recording function included in all packages, from 15 January 1997;
 the launch of caller ID at the end of 1997, followed a few months later by its competitors;
 the launch of the "Millenium" package in November 1999, the first in France to offer unlimited calls during the weekend;
 the launch of the "Spot" formula in March 2000, which offers several minutes of free talktime in exchange for advertising messages during communication; and
 the launch of France's first unlimited evening calling plan to all operators in 2006

By 2001, Bouygues Telecom's market share reached approximately 17%. In that same year, Bouygues Telecom negotiated with NTT DoCoMo regarding a potential partnership and the right to offer the latter's i-mode mobile internet service, which ultimately did not materialise.

In March 2005, the first DVB-H trials in France were carried out by Bouygues Telecom in cooperation with Orange and TPS. Bouygues Telecom subsequently launched EDGE on its mobile network in May 2005.

On 25 May 2009, Bouygues Telecom launched France's first converged quadruple play offer called "ideo", using a combined Internet modem and set-top box called Bbox. This idea was subsequently quickly copied by Orange, SFR and Free Mobile. On 22 October 2010, the Bbox offer was expanded to include fibre in cooperation with Numericable.

On 18 July 2011, Bouygues Telecom launched its lower-cost flanker brand called B&YOU, offering postpaid plans online without fixed contracts.

In January 2016, Bouygues Telecom were subject to negotiations regarding an acquisition from mobile carrier Orange, which did not progress.

In June 2020, Bouygues Telecom acquired Euro-Information Telecom, the MVNE for NRJ Mobile, Auchan Telecom, Cdiscount Mobile, CIC Mobile and Crédit Mutuel Mobile, and subsequently renamed the latter as Bouygues Telecom Business – Distribution in early-2021.

Legal issues

Antitrust Litigation
Along with Orange and SFR, Bouygues Telecom was, in 2005, found by the Autorité de la concurrence (the French competition body) to have acted against the best interests of consumers and the economy by sharing confidential information between 1997 and 2003. The three companies were collectively fined €535 million in total. In November 2007, Bouygues Telecom went to court seeking to have the ruling annulled.

Court Order for Equipment Removal
In February 2009, the company was ordered to take down a mobile phone mast due to uncertainty about its effect on health. Residents in the commune Charbonnières in the Rhône department had sued the company claiming adverse health effects from the radiation emitted by the 19 meter tall antenna. The milestone ruling by the  reversed the burden of proof which is usual in such cases by emphasizing the extreme divergence between different countries in assessing safe limits for such radiation. The court stated that, "Considering that, while the reality of the risk remains hypothetical, it becomes clear from reading the contributions and scientific publications produced in debate and the divergent legislative positions taken in various countries, that uncertainty over the harmlessness of exposure to the waves emitted by relay antennas persists and can be considered serious and reasonable".

Bicycle racing team
They sponsored the bicycle racing team Bbox Bouygues Telecom from 2005 to 2010.

References

External links

 
 Official Website for International Visitors

Bouygues
Mobile phone companies of France
Telecommunications companies established in 1994
French companies established in 1994
French brands
Internet service providers of France